The 2020–21 Detroit Mercy Titans men's basketball team represented the University of Detroit Mercy in the 2020–21 NCAA Division I men's basketball season. The Titans, led by third-year head coach Mike Davis, played their home games at Calihan Hall in Detroit, Michigan as members of the Horizon League.

Previous season
The Titans finished the 2019–20 season 8–23, 6–12 in Horizon League play to finish in ninth place. Due to low APR Scores, the Titans were ineligible for postseason play.

Roster

Schedule and results

|-
!colspan=9 style=| Regular season

|-
!colspan=12 style=| Horizon League tournament
|-

Source

References

Detroit Mercy Titans men's basketball seasons
Detroit Mercy Titans
Detroit Mercy Titans men's basketball
Detroit Mercy Titans men's basketball